Matthew Tuerk (born March 18, 1975) is an American politician and economic development official serving as the mayor of Allentown, Pennsylvania since January 2022. Despite entering a crowded field with low name recognition, Tuerk became the first candidate to defeat an incumbent mayor in an Allentown primary since 1973. Tuerk is the city's first Latino mayor. Previously, he held positions in the Allentown Economic Development Corporation (AEDC) and the Lehigh Valley Economic Development Corporation (LVEDC).

Early life and education
Matthew Tuerk was born in 1975 in East Stroudsburg, Pennsylvania. His grandmother was a Cuban immigrant who settled in East Stroudsburg in 1946. Tuerk was raised speaking English but was surrounded by Cuban traditions and food during his childhood. His family moved from East Stroudsburg to Boulder, Colorado in 1984.

Tuerk earned a BS degree in International Business from the College of Charleston, and received an MBA with a concentration in international economic development from the Darla Moore School of Business at the University of South Carolina. He minored in Spanish and Latin American studies, during which time became particularly interested in Latino culture, learning to speaks Spanish and traveling to Latin America. He spent four years working for an outdoor advertising company in Panama, and later also spent some time in Nicaragua. In 2004, Tuerk and his wife Karen returned to Pennsylvania and moved to Allentown.

Career
Tuerk became an assistant director of the Allentown Economic Development Corporation (AEDC) in 2008 and spent five years with the organization. During his time there, Tuerk helped establish the Urban Manufacturing Alliance, a coalition of cities dedicated to strengthening their manufacturing economies. He also co-founded Make Lehigh Valley, the region's first "hackerspace" located at AEDC's Bridgeworks Enterprise Center business incubator.

In 2013, Tuerk joined the Lehigh Valley Economic Development Corporation (LVEDC), where he worked for seven years. He began with the organization as its first Director of Research and Innovation. He was named Vice President of Economic Development & Marketing in 2015, and became Vice President of Business Attraction, Retention and Expansion in 2019. During his time at LVEDC he worked in a variety of areas, including administration, communications, economic development, entrepreneurial startup support, investor relations, marketing, and research. He left LVEDC in October 2020 to pursue another leadership opportunity.

Through 2021, Tuerk was the chairman the Lehigh-Northampton Airport Authority board of governors, the governing body of the Lehigh Valley International Airport. He was also on the executive committee of Muhlenberg College's board of associates, had previously served on the Board of Trustees at Moravian Academy as treasurer of the Old Allentown Preservation Association, and was a member of the Allentown City Shade Tree Commission.

Mayoral campaign

Tuerk announced his candidacy as a Democratic candidate for Mayor of Allentown on October 6, 2020, about a week after leaving his position at LVEDC. He was the first candidate to enter the race in what was expected to be a crowded field. Tuerk was relatively unknown to voters at the beginning of the primary election. A poll commissioned by developer Nat Hyman projected Tuerk earning only 1% of the Democratic vote, and a separate poll by The Morning Call and Muhlenberg College in April 2021, just one month before the primary election, found only 1 in 10 residents were familiar with Tuerk. The Morning Call newspaper called the Democratic primary race "historically competitive", with Tuerk running against incumbent Mayor Ray O'Connell, City Council President Julio Juridy, and Councilwoman Ce-Ce Gerlach.

In addition to raising funds to improve his name recognition, Tuerk's campaign focused aggressively on meeting voters face-to-face or by phone, setting a goal of talking to 150 voters per weekday, 250 on Saturdays and at least 200 on Sundays. Tuerk also sought to connect with voters who had requested mail-in ballots, since it was the first municipal primary to allow no-excuse voting by mail. Tuerk raised more money than any of the other three primary candidates, and spent $92,000 out of a combined $209,000 spent between the four primary candidates heading into the final two weeks of the race.

Tuerk received 2,064 votes, defeating O'Connell and Guridy by less than two percentage points, and Gerlach by three points. The Morning Call found Tuerk performed well in every precinct of the city, particularly those with high turnout, winning six of the nine precincts in which turnout exceeded 34%. Tuerk also received the most votes by mail with 864. The election marked the first time an incumbent Mayor in Allentown had lost a primary since James P. Ritter defeated Clifford Bartholomew in 1973.

Tuerk went on to face Republican challenger Tim Ramos in the general election. He won the election with 8,206 votes and 64.13% of the vote, compared to 4,299 and 33.6% for Ramos. He was sworn in on January 3, 2022, becoming the first Latino mayor in Allentown's history.

Personal life
Tuerk's wife Karen is a lecturer in environmental science at Muhlenberg College and they have two daughters. Tuerk says he has completed 18 marathons as a runner. He speaks four languages: English, Spanish, Portuguese, and French.

References

1975 births
College of Charleston alumni
University of South Carolina alumni
Living people
Mayors of Allentown, Pennsylvania
Pennsylvania Democrats
American politicians of Cuban descent
Hispanic and Latino American mayors